Hakea epiglottis is a shrub commonly known as beaked hakea or needlebush hakea and is endemic to Tasmania where populations consist of functional unisexual plants.

Description
The inflorescence on male plants have 2-8 flowers whereas female plants  1-3 flowers. The style has a small pollen disc which is concave in male flowers but with a conical protuberance in female flowers.
The young leaves are covered in rust-coloured hairs, which distinguishes this species from the similar Hakea megadenia.
Unisexual populations have male plants which do not produce fruit but flowers that produce pollen. Female populations have fruit with no pollen.  There are recorded populations of bisexual plants where the fruit occur together with flowers producing pollen. Clusters of white through to bright yellow flowers appear in leaf axils in spring.

Taxonomy and naming
The species was first formally described by Jacques Labillardière in Novae Hollandiae Plantarum Specimen in 1805.  The specific epithet (epiglottis) is derived from the Ancient Greek words epi meaning "upon" or "on" 
and glottis meaning "mouth of the windpipe" perhaps a reference to "a perceived resemblance of the fruit to the upper respiratory system". 

There are two recognised subspecies:
Hakea epiglottis subsp. epiglottis  has white hairs on the stalks and base of the flower. A more widely spread subspecies found in all but the north-eastern part of Tasmania.

Hakea epiglottis subsp. milliganii has yellowish white hairs on the stalk  but has rusty coloured hairs near the base of the flower. Has a more restricted distribution, confined to the west coast of Tasmania between Zeehan and Macquarie Harbour.

Distribution and habitat
Hakea epiglottis is a common species found in all but the north-east coast of Tasmania growing in peaty heath.

References

epiglottis
Flora of Tasmania
Endemic flora of Tasmania
Plants described in 1805